Marija Trmčić (Serbian Cyrillic: Марија Трмчић; born in Užice, Yugoslavia on October 20, 1986) is a Serbian alpine skier.

She participated for Serbia both at the 2006 Winter Olympics and the 2010 Winter Olympics, World Championships in Are ( Sweden) and Val d Isere ( France) Winter Universiade in Bardonecchia in Italy and in Harbin in China. She is a longtime champion of Jugoslavia and Serbia in slalom and giant slalom and a medal winner at national and international competitions.
Since 2010. she is I.S.I.A International Ski Instructor and member of Montenegro Demo Ski Team and Demo Team of Serbia. Works in family company, Agency for sport education Ski Art & Raft, with her father and coach Zoran.
Marija is married to Petar Bogojević, ex basketball player. In 2014 they got a daughter Kalina.
In December 2017, she was elected a member of City Council of Užice, Marija's hometown.

Olympic results

References

1986 births
Living people
Sportspeople from Užice
Alpine skiers at the 2006 Winter Olympics
Alpine skiers at the 2010 Winter Olympics
Olympic alpine skiers of Serbia
Olympic alpine skiers of Serbia and Montenegro
Serbian female alpine skiers